Abhijit Mondal (born 1 February 1978) is a former Indian footballer who played as a goalkeeper.

Managerial career
Mondal worked as the goalkeeping coach of India U-20 team at the 2022 SAFF U-20 Championship in Bhubaneswar, and won the tournament with a 5–2 win against Bangladesh.

Honours

Player
Dempo
I-League: 2007–08, 2009–10
Durand Cup: 2006
Federation Cup: 2004
East Bengal
IFA Shield: 2012
Federation Cup: 2012

Manager
India U-20
SAFF U-20 Championship: 2022

References

External links
 
 eastbengaltherealpower.com [Abhijit Mondal Profile]
 Abhijit Mondal Goal.com profile

Indian footballers
Living people
1978 births
I-League players
Footballers from West Bengal
Dempo SC players
United SC players
East Bengal Club players
Indian Super League players
Chennaiyin FC players
People from Balurghat
Association football goalkeepers